Glace Bay-Dominion is a provincial electoral district in Nova Scotia, Canada, that elects one member of the Nova Scotia House of Assembly.

The Member of the Legislative Assembly since 2021 is John White of the Progressive Conservative Party of Nova Scotia.

It was created in 1933 when the district of Cape Breton was divided into five electoral districts, one of which was named Cape Breton East. In 2001, the district name was changed to Glace Bay. In 2003, the district lost a small area at its southern tip to Cape Breton West. Following the 2019 redistribution, it gained the Dominion area from Cape Breton Centre and was re-named Glace Bay-Dominion.

Geography

Members of the Legislative Assembly
This riding has elected the following Members of the Legislative Assembly:

Election results

1925 general election

1928 general election

1933 general election

1937 general election

1941 general election

1945 general election

1949 general election

1953 general election

1956 general election

1960 general election

1963 general election

1967 general election

1970 general election

1974 general election

1978 general election

1980 by-election 

|-
 
|PC
|Donnie MacLeod
|align="right"|4,505
|align="right"|
|align="right"|
|-
 
|NDP
|Reeves Matheson
|align="right"|2,996
|align="right"|
|align="right"|
|-
 
|Liberal
|Vincent Kachafanas
|align="right"|2,904
|align="right"|
|align="right"|
|-

|Independent
|Ignatius V. Kennedy
|align="right"|101
|align="right"|
|align="right"|
|}

1981 general election

1984 general election

1988 general election

1993 general election

1998 general election

1999 general election

2000 by-election 

|-
 
|Liberal
|Dave Wilson
|align="right"|4,017
|align="right"|43.33
|align="right"|
|-
 
|NDP
|Cecil Saccary
|align="right"|3,609
|align="right"|38.93
|align="right"|
|-
 
|PC
|Brad Kerr
|align="right"|1,644
|align="right"|17.74
|align="right"|
|}

2003 general election

2006 general election

2009 general election

2010 by-election 

 
|NDP
|Myrtle Campbell
|align="right"|2,281
|align="right"|31.52
|align="right"|
 
|PC
|Michelle Wheelhouse
|align="right"|759
|align="right"|10.48
|align="right"|

|Independent
|Edna Lee
|align="right"|195
|align="right"|2.69
|align="right"|

2013 general election 

|-
 
|Liberal
|Geoff MacLellan
|align="right"|5,547
|align="right"|80.36
|align="right"|
 
|NDP
|Mary Beth MacDonald
|align="right"|1,001
|align="right"|14.50
|align="right"|
|-
 
|PC
|Thomas Bethell
|align="right"|355
|align="right"|5.14
|align="right"|
|}

2017 general election

2021 general election

References

External links
riding profile
 June 13, 2006 Nova Scotia Provincial General Election Poll By Poll Results
 June 9, 2009 Nova Scotia Provincial General Election Poll By Poll Results

Nova Scotia provincial electoral districts
Politics of the Cape Breton Regional Municipality